Namibia competed at the 1992 Summer Paralympics in Barcelona, Spain. 2 competitors from Namibia won no medals and so did not place in the medal table.

See also 
 Namibia at the Paralympics
 Namibia at the 1992 Summer Olympics

References 

Namibia at the Paralympics
Nations at the 1992 Summer Paralympics